Muthalnaickenpatti is a small village in the Sattur Block of Virudhunagar district in the Indian state of Tamil Nadu.  This village is located between Sattur and Sivakasi.

Geography

The climate is usually hot, with rains during September - November. Temperatures during summer reach a maximum of 35 and a minimum of 25 degrees Celsius. Winter temperatures range between 25 and 19 degrees Celsius. The average annual rainfall is about 75 cm.

References

Villages in Virudhunagar district